XHITC-FM is the radio station of the Instituto Tecnológico de Celaya in Celaya, Guanajuato. It broadcasts on 89.9 MHz and carries a college and cultural radio format under the name "Radio Tecnológico de Celaya".

History
The Instituto Tecnológico de Celaya had lobbied for a radio station since the late 1960s, with the authorization being awarded in 1974. However, the station had no equipment. It was not until April 14, 1978, as part of ITC's 20th anniversary celebrations, when XEITC-AM 1200 hit the air for the first time. The transmitter was donated by XEFG-AM.

The station moved to 1210 kHz in the early 2000s in order to increase power from 250 watts and to avoid interference to WOAI, which broadcasts on 1200 AM in San Antonio, Texas.

However, its largest move was its migration to FM, as XHITC-FM on 89.9 MHz with 6 kW ERP. The FM station debuted on March 22, 2014.

References

Radio stations in Guanajuato
University radio stations in Mexico
Celaya
Radio stations established in 1978
1978 establishments in Mexico